The 1984 Speedway World Team Cup was the 25th edition of the FIM Speedway World Team Cup to determine the team world champions.

The final took place at the Stadion Alfreda Smoczyka, in Leszno, Poland. Denmark easily won their fourth title, winning by 20 clear points in the final.

Qualification

Tournament

See also
 1984 Individual Speedway World Championship
 1984 Speedway World Pairs Championship

References

World Team

Speedway World Team Cup

pl:Drużynowe Mistrzostwa Świata na żużlu 1980